Sean's Show is a British television situation comedy, first broadcast on Channel 4 between 15 April 1992 and 29 December 1993. Stand-up comedian Sean Hughes co-wrote and starred as a fictionalised version of himself, aware that he is living in a sitcom. The show's style drew heavily on It's Garry Shandling's Show (1986–90).

It received a nomination for the 1992 British Comedy Award for Best Channel 4 Sitcom.

Production
In common with a number of British shows of its era, humour often came from repetition of catchphrases or situations. These included Sean's love of The Smiths and Morrissey; conversations with a spider who was actually Elvis Presley; messages on the answerphone from Samuel Beckett and God; "That sock's still not dry"; phone calls from a girl called Angela who Sean definitely "did not lead on"; refugees in the bedroom who do nothing but comment inanely on television programmes; attempts to get scrambled egg from a saucepan and many, many more.

The first series ended with the entire main cast other than Sean killed off in various ways. When he was granted a second series, he was forced to resurrect them all in the first episode.

Episodes

Series 1
Series one is based around Sean's life on a set much like his home in Muswell Hill. He pursues his love Susan while avoiding Angela "who I did not lead on". In the last episode, all of the cast bar Sean are killed off.

Series 2
In series two Sean owns a house in Chelsea "near the football stadium" (a recurring gag is Sean hitting back footballs, occasionally for Crystal Palace F.C.), with his killed off co-stars resurrected as identical twins of their characters. Running jokes include a spider that is the reincarnation of Elvis Presley, cleaning scrambled eggs off a plate, and Bosnian refugees in his spare room.

Home media

Sean's Show: The Complete First Series was released on DVD in October 2007.

References

External links
 
 
  (including series 2 of Sean's Show)

1992 British television series debuts
1993 British television series endings
1990s British sitcoms
Channel 4 sitcoms
English-language television shows
Metafictional television series
Television shows set in London